Millennium is a Swedish six-part television miniseries expanded from the 2009 film adaptations of Stieg Larsson's Millennium book series. The miniseries was produced by Yellow Bird in cooperation with several production companies, including SVT, Nordisk Film, Film i Väst and ZDF Enterprises, and was broadcast on SVT1 from 20 March 2010 to 24 April 2010. It was released later in DVD and Blu-ray in the US under the name Dragon Tattoo Trilogy: Extended Edition.

Millennium was well received, winning a jury award for drama at Kristallen 2010, and an International Emmy Award for Best TV Movie or Miniseries in 2011.

Production
The Millennium TV miniseries is a compilation of the three Swedish film adaptations, The Girl with the Dragon Tattoo,  The Girl Who Played with Fire, and The Girl Who Kicked the Hornets' Nest with extended scenes, adding more depth in both the stories and the characters. It was divided into 6 episodes total, with each episode of the series about 90 minutes long, making the television series about 110 minutes longer than the movies. The series was produced by Yellow Bird in cooperation with several production companies, including SVT, Nordisk Film, Film i Väst and ZDF Enterprises. It was broadcast on SVT1 from 20 March 2010 to 24 April 2010 and released on a DVD and Blu-ray boxset titled Millennium Trilogy on 11 November 2011. Music Box Home Entertainment released the English version in US on 6 December 2011 under the name Dragon Tattoo Trilogy: Extended Edition.

Cast
This is a list of characters who appeared in the series.

Reception
Millennium won the award for "Årets TV-drama" ("TV Drama of the Year") at Kristallen 2010. The series also won the award for "Best TV Movie or Miniseries" at the 39th International Emmy Awards. Paul Pritchard of DVD Verdict praised the choice for reconfiguring the three films into an extended miniseries stating, "This change of format not only doesn't harm the material, it actually enhances it. Given the extra room to breathe, the films are both richer and a much more palatable proposition. Whether by chance or design, each of the films also has a natural break-off point, where each episode can draw to a close; this allows the viewer to take in each story in easily digestible chunks whilst ensuring they are left desperate to find out what happens next. It's also important to stress that the story still maintains its cinematic feel." Thomas Spurlin of DVD Talk gave similar praise stating, "The Swedish film trilogy captures the character examination portion of the equation quite well; combining Noomi Rapace with generally well-adapted text (aside from a few character divergences and rewrites) renders a compelling cinematic exploration of the character, one similar in tone and impact to that in Larsson's text. The films aren't perfect in terms of their effectiveness as procedural thrillers or dramatic powerhouses, but the elements that they do get right elevate the content to something noteworthy."

See also

 Stieg Larsson
 Millennium series

References

External links
 

2010 Swedish television series debuts
2010 Swedish television series endings
Millennium (novel series) adaptations
Live action television shows based on films
Swedish television miniseries
Stockholm in fiction
International Emmy Award for Best TV Movie or Miniseries
Swedish-language television shows